The 2026 ASEAN Para Games, officially the 13th ASEAN Para Games and also known as Nakhon Ratchasima 2026, is an upcoming international multi-sport event sanctioned by the Asean Para Sports Federation (APSF), scheduled to be held from 20 to 26 January 2026 with Nakhon Ratchasima Province as its main city.

This will be the second ASEAN Para Games in Thailand and the second also for Nakhon Ratchasima (previously hosted the 2008 ASEAN Para Games).

Host selection

It is customary for the host nation of the Southeast Asian Games to also host the ASEAN Para Games within the same year.

Bidding and election
On 11 October 2022, Dato Seri Chaipak Siriwat, the vice president of the National Olympic Committee of Thailand (NOCT) revealed the framework of the bidding process that the host cities/provinces should expend for the games at a budget-friendly cost, and they don't have a requirement to build venues anymore. Unlike 2019 and 2021 editions that their competition venues were spread over 23 and 12 cities/provinces respectively, the possible number of host cities/provinces for the games should be limited to 3 or 4.

Eight bidding parties from twelve cities/provinces interested in hosting the games were nominated by Prachum Boontiem, the vice governor of the Sports Authority of Thailand (SAT), in October 2022. Bangkok, Chiang Mai, Nakhon Ratchasima, and Songkhla were submitted as sole bids, while Bangkok/Chonburi, Bangkok/Chonburi/Songkhla, Krabi/Phuket/Trang, and Amnat Charoen/Sisaket/Ubon Ratchathani/Yasothon were submitted as cross-province bids. Although the bidding process was started in October 2022, some bidding parties were revealed their bidding campaigns earlier: Ubon Ratchathani in April 2016, Chonburi in January 2019, and Krabi/Phuket/Trang in February 2021.

The joint bid from Bangkok Metropolitan Region, Chonburi Province, and Songkhla Province and the single bid from Nakhon Ratchasima were awarded to host 33rd Southeast Asian Games and 13th ASEAN Para Games respectively by the Sports Authority of Thailand (SAT) on 13 January 2023 and approved by the Cabinet of Thailand in February 2023. The joint cities/provinces will become the first host cities/provinces to be selected to host the Southeast Asian Games through the bidding process.

See also
2025 Southeast Asian Games in Bangkok, Chonburi and Songkhla

References

 
ASEAN Para Games
ASEAN Para Games
ASEAN Para Games
ASEAN Para Games
ASEAN Para Games 
ASEAN Para Games